Ekundayo Jaiyeoba (born 4 April 1980) is a Nigerian football player who currently plays for Strumska slava in Bulgaria.

Trivia 
Ekundayo is a striker but has spent most of last season recovering from a serious injury that he suffered in late fall of 2004. He joined Levski in 2004 after spending a couple of seasons at Lokomotiv Plovdiv. "Dayo", as fans call him, is a prolific striker and is among the best young attackers in the Bulgarian football championship.

Bulgarian "A" Group
2003-04: Helped Lokomotiv Plovdiv win the Bulgarian APFG League championship with nine goals in 26 appearances.

2004: Featured for Lokomotiv Plovdiv in their UEFA Champions League second round qualifier, as they got eliminated by Belgian side Club Brugge.

2004-05: Started the season with Lokomotiv Plovdiv but later joined another Premier League club Levski Sofia. Signed a three-and-a-half year contract for €150,000. Teamed up with fellow Nigerian Richard Eromoigbe.

2005-06: Sidelined for six months after suffering an Achilles tendon injury in a UEFA Cup first round qualifying game against Slovenian club NK Publikum.

2006-07: Helped Levski Sofia to join at UEFA Champions League Group stage.

2007-08: He started the season with Levski Sofia but on 31 January 2008 he agreement for the transfer of the Nigerian PFC Levski player to the Israeli Maccabi Herzliya has been finalized at the very end of the winter transfer period. The footballer will be playing on loan until the end of the season but there is also an option for the Israeli club to buy his transfer rights.

2008: After playing on loan at Maccabi Herzilya, Levski sold him to Chernomorets in the Bulgarian League. He returns to familiar terrain where he made his mark wearing the colours of Lokomotiv Plovdiv and Levski Sofia.

2009: After several months in Burgas, he is loaned by Vihren Sandanski and later bought.

2010: In June his contract with Vihren expired and he left gladiators to join ambitious Etar 1924.

External links
 Profile at LevskiSofia.info

1980 births
Living people
Yoruba sportspeople
Sportspeople from Lagos
Nigerian footballers
Nigerian expatriate footballers
Association football forwards
PFC Velbazhd Kyustendil players
PFC Lokomotiv Plovdiv players
PFC Levski Sofia players
PFC Chernomorets Burgas players
OFC Vihren Sandanski players
FC Etar 1924 Veliko Tarnovo players
FC Strumska Slava Radomir players
Maccabi Herzliya F.C. players
Expatriate footballers in Israel
Nigerian expatriate sportspeople in Israel
First Professional Football League (Bulgaria) players
Israeli Premier League players
NEPA Lagos players